Ruby Loftus Screwing a Breech-ring is a 1943 painting by the British artist Laura Knight depicting a young woman, Ruby Loftus, working at an industrial lathe cutting the screw of a breech-ring for a Bofors anti-aircraft gun. The painting was commissioned by the War Artists' Advisory Committee as part of the British war effort in the Second World War.

Loftus was a 21-year-old woman who had quickly become an expert in the production of breech-rings—in seven months, rather than the several years it normally took. The painting was commissioned to promote women's work in factories; women dominate the picture, and only one man is visible, in the background. When unveiled at the 1943 Royal Academy Summer Exhibition, the painting was extremely popular, and was voted the picture of the exhibition. The image was reproduced in a large-scale poster version by the WAAC for display in factories across the country.

Background
During the Second World War the British government formed the War Artists' Advisory Committee (WAAC) under the chairmanship of Sir Kenneth Clark, the director of the National Gallery. The committee was "to draw up a list of artists qualified to record the war at home and abroad". One of those commissioned on several occasions was the British painter Laura Knight, who had painted for the Canadian government during the First World War.

Discontent within the factory workforce lead to strikes in the UK in the lead up to January 1943. According to the social research organisation Mass-Observation, women working in war production considered their abilities to be under used, and that potential employees perceived factory girls to be "low class, rough, dirty and immoral". Women, in particular, were more likely to be absent from work than men, with childcare and running the household the probable reasons, according to the art historian Brian Foss. With a shortage in the number of women working in the factories, the Ministry of Production pushed for the war artists to depict production workers.

Knight was commissioned to paint Ruby Loftus in late 1942. She was a machine operator described by the Ministry of Supply as "an outstanding factory worker". Knight, who was working on A Balloon Site, Coventry, turned down the fee of 75 guineas, negotiating 100 guineas plus expenses; even the higher figure was, she said "infinitely lower than I should ask for any other work than that connected to the war". Knight offered to accept the 75 guinea fee, but only if it could be painted in her studio.  The WAAC responded that, although they were grateful that she was working at a much lower level of fees than her pre-war rates, the policy was that all work commissioned was "on a virtually fixed scale of fees irrespective of the status of the artist". The committee added that as Loftus was too valuable to be released from the factory, they would agree to Knight's 100 guinea request; she travelled to Newport, Wales, to paint the portrait in situ over three weeks. The work was completed by the end of March.

Loftus and her family moved to South Wales after their home in Golders Green, London was bombed. She was employed by the Royal Ordnance Factory in Newport (ROF Newport), having previously been an assistant at a tobacconist's shop in Finchley, London. In 1943 she was 21 years old and engaged to John Green, a corporal in the 11th Hussars. Loftus had no prior experience of heavy machinery or the industrial workplace, but she became highly skilled in seven months in making the breech-ring of the Bofors anti-aircraft gun. This was the most complex task at ROF Newport and any lack of precision in forming the breech-ring could result in the gun being destroyed when fired; the task was normally assigned to a worker with up to nine years' experience.

Description

It is one of the largest pictures of the wartime commissions, and the largest of the single-figure portraits they acquired. The painting is in the realist style; the cultural historian Gillian Whiteley considers the painting resembles the works of the Soviet socialist realists, and provides "an authoritative, optimistic, heroic and popular inspirational image". The picture shows Loftus, bent over the lathe, which is in the act of cutting the screw of the breech. Her fingers rest on the machinery as she concentrates on the work she is doing. According to the cultural historian Barbara Morden, Ruby Loftus is similar to other works by Knight in showing a female worker focused on her work. The art historian Catherine Speck writes that Loftus's feminine features and clean hands "affirm the temporary nature of ... [Loftus's] work 'for the duration' " of the war; in this way the painting feels to Speck more like propaganda, rather than an image of Loftus going about her usual work.

According to the cultural historian Barbara Morden, Loftus is depicted as "a young and attractive woman"; with brown curly hair not quite contained under a green headscarf or snood. She wears paint-splattered overalls and make-up, the latter emphasising her femininity. By leaning over the workbench her face is placed in the horizontal centre of the picture, accentuating her importance. Her face is highlighted with the reflection of the light shining on the wet metal. The social historian Elizabeth de Cacqueray observes that Loftus's head and the highlighted metal disk face each other along the diagonal of the picture, with Loftus's head scarf and face repeated ovals that reflect each other.

The painting shows Loftus cutting the screw threads which would attach the barrel to the breech housing of the gun as sparks and water droplets come off the lathe. According to Foss her workspace is "clean and efficient-looking", while the natural approach to the work—and the level of technical details captured in the picture—"had the desired effect of testifying to Loftus's exploit [of being expert at her work] being an indisputable fact".

The background of the painting shows the rest of factory floor, populated with women working at their benches; there is one man present, probably the foreman, given that he wears a tie. The clothing worn by the women carries a patriotic tone, according to the art historian Mike McKiernan, as reds, whites and blues dominate. According to the cultural historian Lindsey Robb, the painting—along with Frank Dobson's 1944 work An Escalator in an Underground Factory—"reinforce the representation of industrial work as female" during wartime.

According to the art historians Teresa Grimes, Judith Collins and Oriana Baddeley, Knight adopts what they call a "documentary approach" to the machinery that "has the verisimilitude of a photograph but makes a far more powerful impact". In this manner, the painting is similar to many examples of British wartime cinema that depicted the working class in an unsentimental manner.

Reception

Ruby Loftus was exhibited at the Royal Academy Summer Exhibition on 30 April 1943. Loftus was present that day to see the picture, and was interviewed by the press about her involvement. The following day the painting was reproduced in several national newspapers. The critic for The Times thought the picture had "a certain brutal vigour", that made it "hard to take in all the detail without strain"; W. T. Oliver, writing in The Yorkshire Post found "little pleasure in Dame Laura's brand of realism", but admired "her energy, her disciplined thoroughness and conviction".

A "Warwork News" newsreel featuring the painting, Knight and Loftus, was released into Britain's cinemas on 10 May 1943; Loftus found herself in the public eye and quickly famous from the coverage, although shop stewards from Woolwich Arsenal, disbelieving the stories of Loftus's prowess in the task, travelled to Newport to check on her skills. They returned satisfied.

Ruby Loftus was shown at the 1947 Engineering and Marine Exhibition at the Olympia Exhibition Centre. The picture was also reproduced in a large-scale poster version by the WAAC; it was displayed in factories across the country. It became one of the most well-known and popular works commissioned by the WAAC.

The picture shows a woman doing what was traditionally a man's job, and, according to Grimes, Collins and Baddeley, helped to popularise a "new, active image of femininity". In this respect it has been likened to the American figure of "Rosie the Riveter"; Norman Rockwell's picture of Rosie appeared on 29 May 1943—a month after Ruby Loftus was first exhibited. According to Foss, "despite the similarity in their two names ... these two wartime icons could hardly be more different.

Legacy

Loftus married Lance Corporal John Green in September 1943, and took her husband's surname. After the war, she was offered an opportunity to take an engineering course, but decided against it and emigrated to Canada with her husband, eventually settling in Winfield, British Columbia, Canada. In British Columbia, she worked as an apple packer, in a post office and as a correspondent for a local newspaper. She travelled to London to see her portrait in the Imperial War Museum in May 1962, where she was accompanied by Knight. She was later diagnosed with multiple sclerosis. Loftus's husband died in 2003, and she died in June 2004 at the age of 83. 
In 2015 Loftus Garden Village, a housing development named after her, was built on the site of ROF Newport.

Looking back at the works Knight painted for the WAAC, Clark wrote to her "The pictures you have done for us have been an immense success from every point of view". The success of the painting led to further industrial commissions for Knight throughout the 1940s. In 1945 she painted Switch Works at Ellison Switchgear in Birmingham. This was followed by paintings of operations at the Dow Mac concrete railway-sleeper works and at the Skefko ball bearing factory. In 1946 she visited Germany under the auspices of the Nuremberg war crimes trials where she painted The Nuremberg Trial.

The painting returned to Newport in 2006 for display as part of a project recording the recollections of women who had worked at the Royal Ordnance Factory. Throughout 2013 and 2014 the painting was lent by the Imperial War Museum for display at the National Portrait Gallery, London, and then at the Plymouth City Museum and Art Gallery, as part of the Laura Knight Portraits exhibition.

See also

 Canary Girls, British women who worked in munitions
 Women in the workforce
 Women in the World Wars
 Bomb Girls

Notes and references

Notes

References

Sources

Books

Journals and magazines

News

Websites

External links
 Ruby Loftus Screwing a Breech-ring on Google Arts & Culture.
 Warwork News, reel 22, Loftus at the Royal Academy Summer Exhibition.

20th-century portraits
1943 paintings
British women in World War II
Paintings in the collection of the Imperial War Museum
Cultural history of World War II
Paintings by Laura Knight
Portraits of women
United Kingdom home front during World War II
War paintings
Women in the United Kingdom
Cultural depictions of British women